The Division of Canning is an Australian Electoral Division in Western Australia.

History

The division was created in 1949 and is named for Alfred Canning, the Western Australian government surveyor who surveyed the Canning Stock Route. It was originally a country seat that traded hands between the two main centre-right parties, the Liberal and Country parties.

Since 1980 it has been located in the southern suburbs of the two largest cities in Western Australia, Perth and Mandurah. For most of its last three decades, it has been a highly marginal seat due to the balanced proportion of the urban north and the rural south, changing hands between the Australian Labor Party and the Liberal Party. Canning had a Liberal margin of 4.3 percent leading into the 2010 election, and was targeted by Labor, who stood high-profile candidate and former state Labor MP Alannah MacTiernan. The Liberals retained the seat; however, Canning was the only Western Australian seat to see a two-party preferred swing toward the Australian Labor Party.

A 2015 Canning by-election, triggered on 21 July following the death of Liberal Don Randall, was held on 19 September. Though the Turnbull Government was just four days old, their candidate Andrew Hastie retained the seat for the Liberals, despite having to rely on preferences after a substantial, though dampened, primary (−4.15%) and two-party (−6.55%) swing away from the Liberals − solidly less than the double-digit swings polls had predicted under an Abbott Government − however, some double-digit swings did eventuate among the northern suburban booths. The Canning Liberal margin was reduced from safe to marginal status. Political analysts agreed the by-election was a "good outcome for both major parties".

In 2016, the more urbanised areas of the City of Armadale west of the Albany Highway and South Western Highway, together with the suburbs of Mount Nasura and Kelmscott, were redistributed to the new Division of Burt.

In August 2021, the Australian Electoral Commission (AEC) announced that the Shire of Boddington would be transferred to the seat of O'Connor, while the Gosnells suburbs of Kenwick, Maddington, Orange Grove and part of Martin would be transferred to Burt. These boundary changes took place at the 2022 election.

Geography
Since 1984, federal electoral division boundaries in Australia have been determined at redistributions by a redistribution committee appointed by the Australian Electoral Commission. Redistributions occur for the boundaries of divisions in a particular state, and they occur every seven years, or sooner if a state's representation entitlement changes or when divisions of a state are malapportioned.

The Division of Canning stretches from Byford and Carmel in the north to Wagerup in the south, and is largely based around the Peel region of Western Australia to the south of Perth.

As of the 2022 election, it includes most of the Peel region, including the City of Mandurah and the Shires of Serpentine-Jarrahdale (including Byford and Mundijong), Murray (including Pinjarra, Yunderup and Dwellingup), and Waroona (including Waroona and Preston Beach). It also includes suburbs of a more semi-rural nature in the Darling Scarp, including the Armadale suburbs of Ashendon, Bedfordale, Karragullen, Lesley, Mount Richon, Roleystone, and Wungong, part of the Gosnells suburb of Martin, and the Kalamunda suburbs of Canning Mills, Carmel, and Pickering Brook.

Members

Election results

See also
 2015 Canning by-election

References

External links
 Division of Canning - Australian Electoral Commission

Electoral divisions of Australia
Constituencies established in 1949
1949 establishments in Australia
Federal politics in Western Australia